Brian Potter (born 26 January 1977) is a Scottish former professional footballer who played as a goalkeeper. He is currently employed as the goalkeeping coach at Hamilton Academical.

Career 
Potter began his career with Raith Rovers, and was the substitute goalkeeper when Scott Thomson was sent off in the 1994–95 Scottish League Cup semi-final. Despite being a YTS player with only one previous first team appearance, Potter played the remainder of the match, conceding once but surviving to a penalty shoot-out. On the final penalty, Alan Lawrence – who had put Raith out of the Scottish League Challenge Cup earlier in the season in a penalty shoot-out – saw his penalty saved by Potter, putting Raith into the final. First choice Thomson was recalled, coincidentally saving the first sudden death penalty to win the final, allowing Potter to pick up a winners' medal as a substitute. Incredibly, Potter should not have been present at either match – Ray Allan, Raith's backup goalkeeper, was ineligible after being an unused substitute earlier in the competition for Motherwell.

Potter failed to make any further first team appearances for Rovers and joined East Fife as a goalkeeping coach.

After a playing spell in junior football with Oakley United, Potter joined Hamilton Academical as a goalkeeping coach.

Potter was signed as a player by Hamilton in March 2008 to offer cover to their two existing goalkeepers. He had been listed as a trialist substitute on a number of occasions earlier in the season. He made his Hamilton debut, as a substitute, against Dundee in April 2008.

On 12 October 2011 he left Hamilton Academical to sign on as a goalkeeping coach at SPL Dunfermline Athletic.

Honours 
Raith Rovers
 Scottish League Cup: 1994–95
 Scottish First Division: 1994–95

References

External links 
 
 

Scottish footballers
Raith Rovers F.C. players
Hamilton Academical F.C. players
1977 births
Living people
Scottish Junior Football Association players
Scottish Football League players
Association football goalkeepers
Dunfermline Athletic F.C. non-playing staff
Hamilton Academical F.C. non-playing staff
Oakley United F.C. players